Anders Osborne (born May 4, 1966, in Uddevalla, Sweden) is an American singer-songwriter. He tours solo and with a band, and often plays in North Mississippi Osborne (N.M.O), a group formed by Osborne and North Mississippi Allstars.

Early life
As a teen, Osborne started playing guitar and listening to Bob Dylan, Neil Young, Jackson Browne, and Joni Mitchell records. He was influenced by the vocal styles of Ray Charles, Van Morrison and Lowell George, Robert Johnson and recordings of African drumming. "Blues connected everything together for me," Osborne recalls. "The early rock, the R&B, the jazz, the singer-songwriters. Blues was like a thread running through everything." He began playing in Open D tuning, which gives his fretwork a signature sound and feel. "I first heard Open D on Joni Mitchell's Blue," he says, "and my fingers just fit the tuning."

Okeh records

Osborne and his band toured the U.S. during these years and in 1995, he was signed to Okeh Records.  He released Which Way to Here, an album that dealt with spirituality and tolerance.  The record became Osborne's first commercial break with two top-five singles  "Favorite Son" and "Pleasin' You." Both were featured in several Hollywood movies, and the latter was later recorded by Jonny Lang.

Shanachie Entertainment
Shanachie Entertainment signed Osborne in 1998 and, in 1999, released his fourth album, Living Room, a personal record that signified some new directions in Osborne's music after the breakup with his longtime accompanist Theresa Andersson, drug use, and a family death.  This album also features guest appearances by Keb' Mo', Kirk Joseph and Tommy Malone.

Besides writing for his own album, Osborne has had a number of his songs successfully recorded by other artists. Keb' Mo's 1999 Grammy Award winning album Slow Down, featured two songs co-written with Osborne.

After his Shanachie recordings, Osborne worked as a professional songwriter in New Orleans and then in Nashville, first for PolyGram and then its successor Universal Music. His song, "Watch the Wind Blow By," was recorded by the country musician Tim McGraw, hitting No. 1 on the country charts for two weeks and selling over three million albums.

More recently, he has co-written with Tab Benoit, Mike Zito and Johnny Sansone, for whom he's also served as producer.

M.C. Records

Returning to New Orleans from Nashville, he recorded Coming Down (2007), a stripped-down semi-acoustic album which was released on the M.C. label and was nominated for the 8th Annual Independent Music Awards Folk/Singer-Songwriter Album of the Year.

Alligator records
In 2009, Osborne recorded a new, full band album co-produced by Osborne, Galactic’s Stanton Moore and Pepper Keenan. All songs on the album were written or co-written by Osborne. The album was picked up by Chicago-based Alligator Records, who signed Osborne and released the new recording in 2010 under the title American Patchwork. New Orleans’ OffBeat magazine praised the album, saying, "American Patchwork is the album Osborne fans have been waiting for. The record is a focused and tuneful triumph. Osborne's gifts as a guitar player are significant. His voice is so emotionally intense it feels like an explosion. He writes with remarkable eloquence...this is the living definition of great art." Relix described the album as "raging, expressive guitar and soulful singing...from scorched-earth rock to sweet, tender ballads."

Since the release of American Patchwork, Osborne has toured virtually non-stop, performing with his own band, solo with Keb Mo, with The Stanton Moore Trio, with Toots and the Maytals, alongside Karl Denson’s Tiny Universe and with Luther Dickinson as well as with The Voice of the Wetlands All-Stars. He appeared on Galactic’s song "Dark Water" from their Ya Ka Ma album, and in 2011 produced and played on critically acclaimed albums by Tab Benoit, Johnny Sansone and Mike Zito. In 2012, he played on and acted as associate producer of Billy Iuso’s Naked album.

Along the way, he also found time to write and record Black Eye Galaxy, released in 2012. Recorded at Dockside Studio in Maurice, Louisiana, the album was produced by Osborne along with engineer Warren Riker and Galactic's Stanton Moore. Its sounds range from heavy electric mayhem to acoustic melodicism. Blurt Magazine said, "Black Eye Galaxy is a work of art – a throwback to the days before corporations completely controlled and corrupted media and culture. It is the struggle of a man to survive addiction and find some peace and redemption. Great art is not afraid to say something and take big risks. And on each work he does, Osborne grows as an artist. We are lucky to get a chance to witness this. The blues is about hard truth and healing. And to the extent he covers both; you could say he is a blues guy. Kudos must go to Alligator Records – a great if not our greatest-blues label – for letting Anders Osborne follow his vision, inspire us with his story and dazzle us with his craft. Black Eye Galaxy is a great album."

In late 2012, he was back in the studio recording a six-song EP entitled Three Free Amigos, which was released by Alligator early in 2013. The EP, produced by Osborne and Warren Riker, focused more on Osborne's melodic, acoustic side. Players included Osborne's touring band of bassist Carl Dufresne and drummer Eric Bolivar, plus guitarist Billy Iuso and multi-instrumentalist Johnny Sansone, Osborne himself played guitar, bass, keyboards and drums on various tracks. It was described by Relix as "rugged, soulful singing superb hard-hitting songs...A phenomenal blend of self-awareness, spirit and muscle."

Osborne continues to tour almost constantly, both with his own band and in combination with other artists. He's appeared multiple times at the New Orleans Jazz & Heritage Festival as well as at Bonnaroo Music Festival, The High Sierra Festival, The Telluride Blues & Brews Festival, The Hollowbaloo Music & Arts Festival in Honolulu, the Hangout Festival, WYEP Summer Music Fest, Central Park SummerStage, Miami Valley Music fest, as well as playing with Phil Lesh and others at Terrapin Crossroads.

In 2015, Osborne was included in the all-star cast headed by Derek Trucks and Susan Tedeschi of Tedeschi Trucks Band in a memorial concert to honor Joe Cocker Mad Dogs & Englishmen at the Lockn' Festival.

His album, Peace, was released on October 8, 2013. Osborne was quoted as saying, "Peace is light from darkness. The songs are written from the outside looking in. They are not making any judgments. I'm just stating facts. I'm writing from a brighter perspective. There's less dusk and dark, and much more sunlight. The results are greater than I expected. The driving tones and sounds are free and natural. This is one of the coolest records I’ve ever made."

Back on Dumaine records 
In fall of 2014 and March 2015, Osborne recorded album Spacedust & Ocean Views in New Orleans; it was released on March 18, 2016. His next album, Flower Box, was released on July 22, 2016.  Anders' third offering on the label the award-winning Buddha and the Blues came out in 2019.

Discography

Albums 

1989: Doin' Fine (Rabadash)
1993: Break The Chain (Rabadash)
1995: Which Way to Here (Okeh)
1996: Break the Chain (Shanachie)
1998: Live at Tipitina's (Shanachie)
1999: Living Room (Shanachie)
2001: Ash Wednesday Blues (Shanachie)
2002: Bury the Hatchet (Shanachie) with Big Chief Monk
2007: Coming Down (M.C. Records)
2010: American Patchwork (Alligator Records)
2012: Black Eye Galaxy (Alligator Records)
2013: Peace (Alligator Records)
2016: Spacedust & Ocean Views (Back on Dumaine Records)
2016: Flower Box (Back on Dumaine Records)
2019: Buddha & The Blues (Back on Dumaine Records)
2021: Orpheus and the Mermaids (5th Ward Records)

Live albums 
2006" Live at Tipitinas"  (MunckMix, Inc. )
2011: Live at 2011 New Orleans Jazz & Heritage Festival (MunckMix, Inc.)

EPs 

2013: Three Free Amigos EP (Alligator Records)

Singles 

2017: "Liquor Drought" (Back on Dumaine Records)

North Mississippi Allstars and Anders Osborne 

Freedom & Dreams (NMO Records)

Awards

Best of the Beat Awards 
Offbeat's Best of the Beat Awards pay tribute each year to musicians who are voted best in a variety of musical categories and genres.

The Big Easy Music Awards 
The Big Easy Music Awards recognize top male and female performers, the best album of the year and winners in 15 music categories, including blues, jazz, Cajun, zydeco, rock and others.

References

External links

 
 About Anders Osborne
 Biography at Alligator Records
 Gambit Weekly: Anders Osborne is the Big Easy Music Awards Entertainer of the Year (30 April 13)
 Living Room review by George Graham
 Anders Osborne: A direct language, a beautiful mystery Feature interview from HonestTune.com
 Feature interview with Ira Haberman, The Sound Podcast

1966 births
Living people
People from Uddevalla Municipality
Songwriters from Louisiana
Swedish singer-songwriters
Swedish male singers